French world may refer to:
 Francophonie, the quality of speaking French
 Organisation internationale de la Francophonie, an organization of French-speaking countries and regions
 Geographical distribution of French speakers
 French colonial empire
 Culture of France